Grabe is a settlement in the Municipality of Apače in northeastern Slovenia.

References

External links 
Grabe on Geopedia

Populated places in the Municipality of Apače